Said Aqil Siradj is an Indonesian Islamic scholar and former chairman of the executive council of Nahdlatul Ulama, the largest Islamic organization in the world. The most recent publication of The 500 Most Influential Muslims by the Royal Islamic Strategic Studies Centre in Jordan ranked him as the 20th most influential Muslim person in the world.

Siradj has consistently spoken out in opposition to the November 2016 Jakarta protests. Siradj cited a fatwa that prohibited praying in the street as the protesters had planned since it disturbed the peace, though his position was immediately opposed by Indonesian Ulema Council, an organization specifically of religious leaders which includes Nadhlatul Ulama leaders. Siradj event cited the positions of the Maliki and Shafi'i schools of thought within Sunni Islam that prohibit praying the congregational prayers in the middle of a street.

In addition to his leadership within Nahdlatul Ulama, Siradj also founded the Said Aqil Centre, an organization in Egypt which focuses on developing Islamic discourse in the Middle East, and since 2021 has become the chairman of the board of commissioners of Kereta Api Indonesia.

References

Indonesian Islamic religious leaders
Indonesian Sunni Muslims
Living people
Sunni Muslim scholars of Islam
Nahdlatul Ulama
1953 births
People from Cirebon
King Abdulaziz University alumni
Umm al-Qura University alumni